Baba Khajan Das College of Management Technology is a business college located in Ludhiana in the state of Punjab, India. It was established by the Keharnam Memorial Educational Society in 2009.

Location
It is located in the village of Bhutta in the city of Ludhiana, a metropolitan city of Punjab state.

Courses Offered
There are Bachelor and Masters programs offered in the following streams:
BCA
BBA
B.COM
BAMT
B.Sc(IT)
M.Sc(IT)

References

Colleges in India
Business schools in Punjab, India
Education in Ludhiana
Science and technology in Ludhiana
Educational institutions established in 2009
2009 establishments in Punjab, India